The Common Guild is a visual arts organisation in Glasgow, Scotland. It was established in 2006 and has commissioned two Turner Prize-nominated works: Duncan Campbell in 2014 and Janice Kerbel in 2015.

The Common Guild is located in a Victorian townhouse owned by Glasgow artist Douglas Gordon. The building houses The Common Guild's offices, a library designed by artist Andrew Miller containing books belonging to Douglas Gordon, and public event and exhibition spaces. In 2019, the event and exhibition spaces are due to close while the organisation continues its off-site project work and looks for a new permanent exhibition space.

Exhibitions hosted by The Common Guild have included solo shows by Martin Creed, Steven Claydon, Roni Horn, Tacita Dean, Wolfgang Tillmans and Roman Ondák; and numerous group shows.

Beyond their own gallery space, The Common Guild organise and curate exhibitions and art events such as 'the Persistence of Objects' at Lismore Castle Arts in 2015 and 'Scotland + Venice 2013' at the 55th Venice Biennale.

Between 2008 and 2013, The Common Guild worked with Gallery of Modern Art, Glasgow (GoMA) and Art Fund to build a new collection of international contemporary work for Glasgow including works by Emily Jacir, Matthew Buckingham and Lothar Baumgarten among others, many of which are regularly on display at GoMA.

21 Woodlands Terrace provided a key location for the filming of Glasgow: The Grit and the Glamour, a film in the BBC's Imagine series.

Solo shows

 Adel Abdessemed, 'TRUST ME', 2008
 Spencer Finch, 2008
 Roni Horn, 'the tiniest piece of mirror is always the whole mirror', 2009
 Mircea Cantor, 'Which light kills you’, 2010
 Martin Creed, 'Things', 2010
 Gerard Byrne, 'Images or shadows of divine things', 2010
 Robert Barry, 'Words and Music', 2010
 Tacita Dean, 2011
 Ulla von Brandenburg, 'Neue Alte Welt', 2011
 Thea Djordjadze, 'Lost Promise in a Room', 2011
 Wolfgang Tillmans, 'A New Installation, with Works from the Arts Council Collection', 2012
 Ugo Rondinone, 'primitive', 2012
 Carol Bove, 'The Foamy Saliva of a Horse', 2013

 Roman Ondák, 'Some Thing', 2013
 Gabriel Kuri, 'All probability resolves into form', 2014
 Hayley Tompkins, 'Scotland + Venice', 2014
 Corin Sworn, 'Scotland + Venice', 2014
 Duncan Campbell, 'Scotland + Venice', 2014
 Anne Hardy, 'TWIN FIELDS', 2015
 Thomas Demand, 'Daily Show', 2015
 Akram Zaatari, 'The End of Time', 2016
 Simon Starling, ‘At Twilight’, 2016
 Sharon Hayes, 'In My Little Corner of the World, Anyone Would Love You', 2016
 Steven Claydon, ‘The Archipelago of Contented Peoples: Endurance Groups’, 2017
 Katinka Bock, 'Radio Piombino', 2018
 Janice Kerbel, 'Notes from Sink / Routine for 24 Women', 2018

Group Shows

'Always Begins By Degrees', Adel Abdessemed, Roni Horn, Anna Gaskell, Pavel Büchler, Marine Hugonnier, Marcel Broodthaers, Philippe Parreno, Cerith Wyn Evans, 2008
 “You seem the same as always, -”, Claire Barclay, Kate Davis, Olafur Eliasson, Hans-Peter Feldmann, Douglas Gordon, Gabriel Orozco, Yvonne Rainer, Richard Serra and David Shrigley, 2011

 'HOW TO LOOK AT EVERYTHING', Zbynek Baladrán, Simon Martin, Nick Relph & Falke Pisano, 2012
 'Slow Objects', Vanessa Billy, Edith Dekyndt and Erin Shirreff, 2017

Off-site Exhibitions

 Martin Creed ‘Words and Music’ at the RSAMD (now Royal Conservatoire), 2007
 ‘Jardins Publics’ with Michael Lin, Apolonija Sustersic and Richard Wright for Edinburgh International Festival, 2007
 The Rodney Graham Band featuring the Amazing Rotary Psycho-Opticon, at the ABC, 2008
 Ruth Ewan ‘The Glasgow Schools’ at Scotland Street School, 2012

 Janice Kerbel ‘Doug’ in The Jeffrey Room, The Mitchell Library, 2014
 Phil Collins ‘Tomorrow is Always too Long’ in Queen's Park, 2014
 Ulla von Brandenburg ‘Sink Down Mountain, Rise Up Valley’ in Langside Halls, 2016
 Simon Starling and Graham Eatough ‘At Twilight’ at Holmwood House, 2016
 Janice Kerbel ‘Sink’ at The Western Baths Club, 2018

References

External links
 Common Guild website
 Common Guild on Twitter

Art museums and galleries in Glasgow
Arts centres in Scotland
Event venues established in 2006
Arts organisations based in Scotland
Contemporary art galleries in Scotland
Scottish contemporary art
2006 establishments in Scotland